The Special Marriage (Amendment) Bill, 2022 is a Bill of the Parliament of India which seeks to legalise same-sex marriage in India by amending the Special Marriage Act, 1954. It was filed in the Lok Sabha on 2 April 2022 by MP Supriya Sule as a Private member's bill. The proposal would amend various sections of the Act to provide same-sex couples with the same legal rights as opposite-sex couples. The bill would fix the marriageable age at 21 for male couples and at 18 for lesbian couples.

References

See also 

 LGBT rights in India
 Transgender Persons (Protection of Rights) Act, 2019

LGBT rights in India
Proposed laws of India
2022 in Indian politics